Joseph Dylan Jones (born 15 April 1994) is a professional footballer who plays as a midfielder for National League side Solihull Moors.

Despite being born in England, he won caps for Northern Ireland up until under-21 level. He spent time in the youth-teams at Arsenal, Leicester City and Yeovil Town, before signing with Woking in July 2014 after a successful loan spell He spent four years with the club, before joining Eastleigh in June 2018. He was signed by English Football League club Salford City in June 2019 and has also played for Dagenham & Redbridge and Grimsby Town.

Club career

Early career
On 26 June 2013, he signed a six-month contract with Championship club Yeovil Town. On 10 September, a Yeovil XI played a Bournemouth XI in a behind closed doors friendly and Jones was one of the goalscorers for the "Glovers". His contract was later extended until the end of the 2013–14 season. On 31 January, he joined Conference Premier club Woking on an initial one-month loan, which was later extended into a second month. He made his debut in senior football in Woking's 5–1 defeat at Dartford and was sent off on 34 minutes for a foul on Jim Stevenson. On 29 March, he scored his first goal in a 2–1 win over Wrexham at the Kingfield Stadium. He scored two goals in 12 games during his loan spell, but left Huish Park after he was released by Yeovil in May 2014.

Woking
On 14 July 2014, Jones signed a permanent deal with Woking. He made 50 appearances across the 2014–15 season, as the "Cards" narrowly missed out on a play-off place. He signed a new one-year deal in May 2015, having rejected approaches from Cheltenham Town (managed by former Yeovil boss Gary Johnson) and Dover Athletic, and stated that he hoped to nail down a more clearly defined and settled role in the team following discussions with Garry Hill and the departure of central midfielder Josh Payne. He scored five goals from 47 games in the 2015–16 campaign as the "Cardinals" posted a 12th-place finish. On 25 February 2017, he scored a goal from 40-yards in a 4–3 defeat to Forest Green Rovers that later won him the club's goal of the season award. He signed a new contract with Woking in May 2017, having hit five goals from 50 games in the 2016–17 campaign, helping Woking to finish three points above the relegation zone. He made 36 appearances across the 2017–18 season, scoring one goal, as Woking were relegated out of the National League.

Eastleigh
On 29 June 2018, Jones signed with Andy Hessenthaler's Eastleigh. He scored two goals from 35 matches in the 2018–19 season, featuring in the National League play-off quarter-final defeat at Wrexham. He was offered a new contract by manager Ben Strevens.

Salford City
On 4 June 2019, Jones signed a two-year deal with newly-promoted EFL League Two side Salford City. He made his debut in the English Football League on 10 August, coming on for Mark Shelton at half-time in a 2–0 defeat at Crawley Town. He left the club by mutual consent on 9 November 2020.

Dagenham & Redbridge
On 10 November 2020, Jones signed for National League side Dagenham & Redbridge until June 2022.

On 25 March 2022, Jones joined National League promotion rivals Grimsby Town on loan for the remainder of the 2021–22 season. Upon signing for Grimsby, Jones told local news that he would be looking to move away from Dagenham on a permanent basis when his contract expires in the summer. 

On 1 June 2022, Dagenham announced that they would be releasing Jones at the end of his contract.

Solihull Moors
On 1 July 2022, Jones signed for National League side Solihull Moors on a one-year deal.

International career
Eligible to represent Northern Ireland due to his father, Dave, he was capped at all youth-team ages up until receiving an under-21 cap against Hungary on 15 August 2012.

Style of play
Jones describes himself as a central midfielder who likes "to get about the park, get on the ball.... [and I have a good] passing range [so] I’m going to bring a lot of different passes and shots".

Career statistics

Honours
Grimsby Town
National League play-off winners: 2022

References

1994 births
Living people
Footballers from Kingston upon Thames
Association footballers from Northern Ireland
Northern Ireland youth international footballers
Northern Ireland under-21 international footballers
Association football midfielders
Association football defenders
Arsenal F.C. players
Leicester City F.C. players
Yeovil Town F.C. players
Woking F.C. players
Eastleigh F.C. players
Salford City F.C. players
Dagenham & Redbridge F.C. players
Grimsby Town F.C. players
National League (English football) players
English Football League players